Desperado is a 1970 post-bop jazz album by Pat Martino.

“A key album in the shift in Pat Martino's sound at the end of the 60s -- with one foot in the soul jazz camp in which he got his start, and the other in the freer, open-minded style he used a lot in the 70s!”

Reception
Jazz critic Scott Yanow described the album as “funky in spots, electric, and swinging when called for” and extols Martino's performance as “consistently inventive"

The authors of the Penguin Guide to Jazz Recordings wrote: "Desperado is a little-known stab at fusion: Martino plays electric 12-string against rumbling electric piano and bass, and the results are akin to a tighter, less violent Lifetime. 'Express' and 'Desperado' hit a particularly compelling movement."

In an article for All About Jazz, Ian Patterson wrote: "Martino's inventiveness... seems inexhaustible... Though Martino's soloing has the energy of rock, the language is unmistakably jazz, with a clear melodic logic. There is also a gentler side to his playing, as witnessed on the caressing ballad 'A Portrait of Diana.' 'Express' caps an excellent album on a thrilling note."

“Even this difficult instrument doesn’t dampen his proficiency.”

Background
Recorded at the legendary Rudy Van Gelder studios, Mr. Martino chose a 12 string guitar to define his interpretations of his own compositions and "Oleo" by Sonny Rollins.

Track listing
"Blackjack" (Martino) – 7:45
"Dearborn Walk" (Martino)– 3:50
"Oleo" (Sonny Rollins) – 4:53
"Desperado" (Martino, Green) – 7:55
"A Portrait of Diana" (Martino) – 4:30
”Express” (Martino) – 6:43

CD Reissue
Remastered versions of the album (one being from 1989) do not include any bonus tracks and are stereo versions of the original stereo recording.

Personnel
Pat Martino – 12-string electric guitar
Eric Kloss – soprano sax (track 1)
Eddie Green – electric piano
Tyrone Brown – electric bass
Sherman Ferguson – drums, bells
Les Paul – notes
Rudy Van Gelder – recording
Bob Porter – supervision

References

Pat Martino albums
1970 albums
Prestige Records albums
Albums produced by Bob Porter (record producer)